"Kei a Wai Ra te Kupu" is a song by New Zealand Māori pop group Aaria, released as a single in 2001. It reached number 14 on the New Zealand singles chart and received a Platinum Plaque for CD sales.

Track listings
Kei a Wai Ra Te Kupu (Maori Radio Edit)
Kei a Wai Ra Te Kupu (English Radio Edit)
Kei a Wai Ra Te Kupu (Maori 2 Step Garage Remix)
Kei a Wai Ra Te Kupu (Maori A cappella Mix)
Born of Greatness

References

2001 songs
2001 singles
Aaria songs
Māori-language songs